Francis John Deig (September 20, 1909 – October 29, 1960) was an American athlete and sports coach. He served as the head football coach at the University of St. Thomas from 1946 to 1957, the head basketball coach at St. Thomas from 1940 to 1946, and the athletic director of St. Thomas from 1941 to 1958. He played college football and basketball at Marquette University.

Early life and education
Deig was born on September 20, 1909, in Black Township, Indiana. He first attended St. Matthew Parochial School before transferring to Mount Vernon Senior High School. He later transferred a second time to Jasper Academy, where he starred in football, basketball, and baseball. He had a batting average of .484 as a senior at Jasper Academy, a record that was still standing by 1949. After graduating from there, Deig enrolled at Marquette University. He played basketball and football at Marquette, and in the latter earned All-American honors as well as All-Western honors.

Coaching career
Deig became the football and basketball coach at St. Augustine High School in 1934. The 1935 football team went undefeated and scored 275 points. A 1936 article in the Star Tribune wrote "Down at Austin they are mighty proud of the St. Augustine high school team ... The team is coached by Francis Deig, former Marquette university end who won All-American mention four years ago. All of the townspeople are talking about it. The team is big and experienced. Deig has been working on his present squad for three years and many say it is one of the best coached they have ever seen." He finished his time at St. Augustine with 24 consecutive wins.

In 1937, Deig became a coach and physical education faculty at Saint Thomas Academy. He served as head basketball coach until 1940 and as head football coach through 1945. His football team compiled a record of 52–11–7, winning six conference championships.

In 1940, Deig was appointed the athletic director and head basketball coach at the University of St. Thomas, replacing Nic Musty. By the start of 1946, his record as head basketball coach was 71–28. In January 1946, he was named head football coach as well. The 1946 St. Thomas football team went 4–3, placing second in the Minnesota Intercollegiate Athletic Conference (MIAC). In just his second year with the football team, Deig led them to the conference championship. He led them to the championship again in 1948 and for a third consecutive year in 1949, also helping them achieve a Cigar Bowl berth in 1949. The Cigar Bowl invitation was the first bowl invite ever for a team in the MIAC. In 1956, he led St. Thomas to a fourth MIAC championship with an undefeated 7–0 record. He resigned in April 1958.

Death
Two years after his retirement, Deig died at the age of 51 from a heart attack.

Head coaching record

College football

References

1909 births
1960 deaths
Players of American football from Indiana
American football punters
American football ends
American football fullbacks
Baseball players from Indiana
Basketball players from Indiana
Marquette Golden Eagles men's basketball players
Marquette Golden Avalanche football players
High school basketball coaches in Minnesota
High school football coaches in Minnesota
St. Thomas (Minnesota) Tommies men's basketball coaches
St. Thomas (Minnesota) Tommies football coaches
University of St. Thomas (Minnesota) faculty